B with flourish (Ꞗ, ꞗ) is the modern name for the third letter of the Middle Vietnamese alphabet, sorted between B and C. The B with flourish has a rounded hook that starts halfway up the stem (where the top of the bowl meets the ascender) and curves about 180 degrees counterclockwise, ending below the bottom-left corner. It represents the voiced bilabial fricative , which in modern Vietnamese merged with the voiced labiodental fricative, written as the letter V in the Vietnamese alphabet. (In Middle Vietnamese, V represented the labio-velar approximant .)

Usage

The B with flourish is known principally from the works of Jesuit missionary Alexandre de Rhodes, particularly his trilingual dictionary  (1651) and bilingual  (1658). For example,  was written . As with the letter Đ, only the lowercase form ꞗ is seen in these works, even where a capital letter would be expected.

The Vietnamese alphabet was formally described for the first time in the 17th-century text , attributed to a Portuguese Jesuit missionary, possibly Francisco de Pina or Filipe Sibin. This passage about the letter Ꞗ was later incorporated into de Rhodes's :

The passage roughly translates to:

The linguistic interpretation of this description is that the sound was a voiced bilabial fricative, which phoneticians transcribe with the Greek letter beta [β].

Although some peculiarities of de Rhodes's orthography persisted into the early 19th century, the B with flourish had by then become V, as seen in the writings of Vietnamese Jesuit Philipphê Bỉnh (Philiphê do Rosario).

Computer support
The lowercase B with flourish and a hypothetical uppercase form, unattested in de Rhodes's works, were standardized in June 2014 as part of the Latin Extended-D block of Unicode 7.0.

See also

 Apex (diacritic), another distinctive element of de Rhodes's orthography

References

External links
 Đắc Lộ font for Vietnamese that supports B with flourish

Vietnamese language
Latin letters with diacritics
Palaeographic letters